Washington County Jail and Sheriff's Residence is a historic jail and residence located at Salem, Washington County, Indiana. It was built in 1881, and is a Second Empire style brick and stone building.  It consists of a -story residence with a mansard roof with a -story rear jail addition. An office addition was added to the jail in 1974.

It was listed on the National Register of Historic Places in 1984.  It is included in the Salem Downtown Historic District.

References

External links

Jails in Indiana
National Register of Historic Places in Washington County, Indiana
Second Empire architecture in Indiana
Government buildings completed in 1881
Buildings and structures in Washington County, Indiana
Houses completed in 1881
Individually listed contributing properties to historic districts on the National Register in Indiana
Jails on the National Register of Historic Places in Indiana
Houses on the National Register of Historic Places in Indiana
1881 establishments in Indiana